The Interdecadal Pacific oscillation (IPO) is an oceanographic/meteorological phenomenon similar to the Pacific decadal oscillation (PDO), but occurring in a wider area of the Pacific. While the PDO occurs in mid-latitudes of the Pacific Ocean in the northern hemisphere, the IPO stretches from the southern hemisphere into the northern hemisphere. 

The period of oscillation is roughly 15–30 years. Positive phases of the IPO are characterized by a warmer than average tropical Pacific and cooler than average northern Pacific. Negative phases are characterized by an inversion of this pattern, with cool tropics and warm northern regions.

The IPO had positive phases (southeastern tropical Pacific warm) from 1922 to 1946 and 1978 to 1998, and a negative phase between 1947 and 1976.

References

Physical oceanography
Regional climate effects
Pacific Ocean
Climate oscillations